was a town located in Taka District, Hyōgo Prefecture, Japan.

As of 2003, the town had an estimated population of 7,296 and a density of 86.80 persons per km². The total area was 84.06 km².

On November 1, 2005, Kami, along with the towns of Naka and Yachiyo (all from Taka District), was merged to create the town of Taka.

External links
 Kami official website in Japanese

Dissolved municipalities of Hyōgo Prefecture
Taka, Hyōgo